"There It Is" is a funk song by James Brown. It was arranged by Dave Matthews. Released as a two-part single in 1972, it charted #4 R&B and #43 Pop. Both parts of the song also appeared on an album of the same name.

A live performance of "There It Is" is included on the 1988 compilation album Motherlode.

References

James Brown songs
Songs written by James Brown
1972 singles
1972 songs